Catapano is an Italian surname. Notable people with the surname include:

David Catapano (born 1973), American chef, writer and television personality
Letterio Catapano, Italian footballer
Mike Catapano (born 1990), American football player
Thomas F. Catapano (1949–2005), American politician

Italian-language surnames